Krešimir Kordić (born 3 September 1981) is a Croatian retired football player.

Club career
Kordić made his professional debut for boyhood and hometown club Zrinjski Mostar in 1999. In his first two seasons as a professional, the striker scored 16 goals in 43 appearances, earning himself a move to 1. HNL side Hrvatski Dragovoljac in January 2002. After six months with NK Hrvatski Dragovoljac where Krešimir failed to establish himself as a first team regular, he moved to Croatian side Zadar. In three years with Zadar, Kordić managed seven goals in 32 appearances.

In 2005, Kordić made his return to Mostar, resigning with HŠK Zrinjski Mostar. His spell at Zrinjski was very successful, scoring 21 goals in 44 games. In 2007, Kordić moved to fellow Croatian - Hercegovinian side Posušje and had another successful season. After just one year with Posušje, Kordić moved back to Zrinjski and scored 33 goals in 71 games over the next two seasons.

In 2010, Kordic made his first international transfer, moving to Slovak side Slovan Bratislava. Kordic won the Corgoň liga and Slovak Cup in his first season with the Slovak club and scored 5 goals in 20 games. Before the end of his contract with Slovan Bratislava he was loaned out to DAC 1904 Dunajská Streda in 2012 and spent three months there.

Once his contract with Slovan expired, Široki Brijeg enticed him back to Bosnia and Herzegovina and he signed a two-year contract. He scored 25 goals in 63 games in national and continental competitions for Široki.

In the summer of 2014, newly crowned champions of Bosnia and Hercegovina Zrinjski Mostar brought back the fan favourite as their first reinforcement. The last season of his contract, he won third championship with Zrinjski.
He scored the most goals (75) in Zrijnski's history and he is currently on the fourth (4) place of Bosnian Premier league topscorers from beginning scoring 84 goals. Also he is one of successful players from Bosnia and Herzegovina winning 4 national championships and 2 cups.

Career statistics

Club

Honours
Club

HŠK Zrinjski Mostar

Bosnian Premier League: 2004–05, 2008-09, 2015–16
ŠK Slovan Bratislava

Fortuna Liga: 2010–11,
Slovak Cup: 2010–11,

NK Široki Brijeg

Bosnia-Herzegovina Cup: 2012–13

Individual
 HŠK Zrinjski Mostar Top Goalscorer (5) : 2000-01, 2005–06, 2006–07, 2008–09, 2009–10
 HŠK Zrinjski Mostar Player of the Season 2008–09 by supporters
 HŠK Zrinjski Mostar all time XI
  NK Široki Brijeg Top Goalscorer : 2012/13
 Premier League of Bosnia and Herzegovina  Team of the Year (3): 2007, 2009, 2013
 Third highest scorer in Bosnia and Herzegovina in all competitions of all time with 112 goals
Fifth highest Premier League of Bosnia and Herzegovina  scorer of all time with 83 goals

Records
 Record Bosnia-Herzegovina Cup scorer of all time with 30 goals

External links
Krešimir Kordić profile
 
 

1981 births
Living people
Sportspeople from Mostar
Croats of Bosnia and Herzegovina
Bosnia and Herzegovina footballers
Association football forwards
HŠK Zrinjski Mostar players
Bosnia and Herzegovina expatriate footballers
Expatriate footballers in Croatia
Premier League of Bosnia and Herzegovina players
Croatian Football League players
HNK Hajduk Split players
Bosnia and Herzegovina expatriate sportspeople in Croatia
NK Hrvatski Dragovoljac players
NK Zadar players
HŠK Posušje players
Expatriate footballers in Slovakia
Slovak Super Liga players
ŠK Slovan Bratislava players
FC DAC 1904 Dunajská Streda players
NK Široki Brijeg players
Bosnia and Herzegovina expatriate sportspeople in Slovakia